The Rio Puerco is a tributary of the Rio Grande in the U.S. state of New Mexico.

The Rio Puerco is ephemeral, with no streamflow for part of the year. Its discharge averages . Another flood, on August 12, 1929, reached an estimated .

Name
Although Rio Puerco means River of Pigs in Spanish, this usage in the southwestern United States is better translated as Muddy River.

Course
The Rio Puerco arises in the San Pedro Peaks area of the Nacimiento Mountains, in the San Pedro Parks Wilderness area of the Santa Fe National Forest. It flows generally south and southwest, leaving the mountains and national forest near the village of Cuba. From there the river flows generally south. It flows along the west side of the Jemez Indian Reservation. Arroyo Chico joins from the west, between Mesa San Luis and Mesa Chivato. The Rio Puerco continues south, passing west of Mesa Prieta, then through the Laguna Indian Reservation and the Tohajiilee Indian Reservation. Near the Bernalillo–Valencia county line and the Isleta Indian Reservation the river is joined by the Rio San Jose, which flows from the west near Grants through the Laguna Reservation.

History
The Rio Puerco Valley is notable for once hosting a significant numbers of ancestral Puebloan (descendants of the Basketmaker II) people, many of them fleeing the collapse of the Chacoan civilization.

In the 1860s the US Army moved strongly against Native American raiding west of the Rio Grande. By the late 1860s the Navajo were no longer a chronic threat and the Apache had been pushed back into the high mountains. The Hispanos living along the Rio Grande were able to move west with some security for the first time. Hispano colonists from Albuquerque and Bernalillo quickly occupied every irrigable patch of land along the Rio Puerco. By the middle of the 20th century decades of overgrazing and flash flooding had rendered the Rio Puerco country virtually uninhabitable and it was abandoned.

Sediment and erosion
As it carries high levels of sediment, the Rio Puerco is a major source of suspended particulate matter.  Overgrazing has made the Rio Puerco Basin of central New Mexico one of the most eroded river basins of the western United States and has increased the high sediment content of the river. The USGS collects suspended-sediment samples at its stream gage three miles (5 km) above the river's mouth. A maximum daily mean of sediment concentration of 417,000 mg/L was recorded on July 25, 2008. The maximum recorded daily sediment load was 2,240,000 tons, recorded on August 7, 1957.

See also
 List of rivers of New Mexico
 List of tributaries of the Rio Grande
 Silvester Mirabal

References

Tributaries of the Rio Grande
Rivers of New Mexico
Rivers of Socorro County, New Mexico
Rivers of Valencia County, New Mexico
Rivers of Bernalillo County, New Mexico
Rivers of Sandoval County, New Mexico
Rivers of Rio Arriba County, New Mexico